Hay is a masculine given name and nickname. It may refer to:

 Hay Frederick Donaldson (1856–1916), Australia-born English mechanical engineer and British Army brigadier-general
 Hay MacDowall (died 1809), British Army lieutenant general, General Officer Commanding, Ceylon
 Hay Millar (1883–1944), Canadian ice hockey player
 Hay Petrie (1895–1948), Scottish actor
 Hay Plumb (1883–1960), English actor and film director born Edward Hay-Plumb
 Hay Wilson (died 1925), Anglican priest, Dean of Moray, Ross and Caithness

Masculine given names
Lists of people by nickname